The Dan Bradley House is a historic house located at 59 South Street in Marcellus, Onondaga County, New York.

Description and history 
It was built between about 1804 and 1812, and is a two-story, frame dwelling with a -story rear ell and Federal-style details. Also on the property is a contributing small frame barn. Dan Bradley was a pastor and judge, and his son Dan Beach Bradley, was a 19th-century medical missionary to Thailand.

It was listed on the National Register of Historic Places on December 12, 1978.

References

External links

Houses on the National Register of Historic Places in New York (state)
Historic American Buildings Survey in New York (state)
Federal architecture in New York (state)
Houses completed in 1804
Houses in Onondaga County, New York
National Register of Historic Places in Onondaga County, New York